Bruce King (April 6, 1924 – November 13, 2009) was an American businessman and politician who for three non-consecutive four-year terms was the governor of New Mexico. A member of the Democratic Party, he was the longest-serving governor in New Mexico history, with 12 years of service.

Early life, education, and early political career
King was born on April 6, 1924 in Stanley, New Mexico. He served in the U.S. Army during World War II.  After the war, he attended the University of New Mexico in Albuquerque, New Mexico.

King's career in politics began when he was elected to the Santa Fe Board of County Commissioners in 1954. He was re-elected and served as the chairman of the board during his second term.

In 1959, he was elected to the New Mexico House of Representatives. He served five consecutive terms in the House and during three of his terms he was Speaker of the House. From 1968-69, King was chairman of the state Democratic Party. In 1969, he was also the president of the State Constitutional Convention.

Governor of New Mexico

In 1970, King was elected as governor, defeating Republican Pete Domenici. He served as the 23rd, 25th and 28th Governor of New Mexico from 1971 until 1975, 1979 until 1983 and from 1991 until 1995. His terms were non-consecutive because the New Mexico constitution did not allow governors to succeed themselves before 1991, due to term limits.

King became the first governor who could succeed himself after the term limit laws were changed and ran for reelection in 1994, but was defeated for a fourth term by Republican businessman Gary Johnson.

Personal life

King was married to his wife Alice for 61 years until her death on December 7, 2008. Their son Gary King served as New Mexico Attorney General from 2007 to 2015 and was the Democratic nominee for governor in 2014.

King was recovering from a procedure in September 2009 to adjust the pacemaker that was implanted after he had a heart attack in 1997. He died on November 13, 2009 in Stanley, New Mexico, at the age of 85.

Bibliography
Becknell, Charles Sr. (2003) "No Challenge, No Change: Growing Up Black in New Mexico" Jubilee Publications. 
Colvin, Mark (1982). "The 1980 New Mexico Prison Riot." Social Problems 29.
Colvin, Mark (1992). "The Penitentiary in Crisis:From Accommodation to Riot in New Mexico, State University of New York Press.
King, Bruce (1998). Cowboy in the Roundhouse: A Political Life. Santa Fe: Sunstone Press.
McCaffery, Fred (February 14, 1979). "Political Game Snares Becknell" New Mexican Opinion"New Report Describes Events Surrounding New Mexico Prison Riot". (June 8, 1980). The New York Times''.

References

External links
 
 

1924 births
2009 deaths
20th-century American politicians
United States Army personnel of World War II
County commissioners in New Mexico
Democratic Party governors of New Mexico
Military personnel from New Mexico
People from Stanley, New Mexico
Speakers of the New Mexico House of Representatives
Democratic Party members of the New Mexico House of Representatives
State political party chairs of New Mexico
University of New Mexico alumni